Laura Csortan (born 9 November 1976) is an Australian model and television presenter.

Career

Modelling
Csortan was crowned Miss Australia 1997 and represented her country in Miss Universe 1997, where she won Miss Congeniality and finished in 13th place. Csortan competed in Miss World 1997, where she was a top 10 semi-finalist.

Television
From October 2000 until November 2008, she was a host of The Great Outdoors on the Seven Network. She formerly co-hosted the Australian version of Wheel of Fortune, with Larry Emdur.

She hosted Channel 7's broadcast of the BBC's Massive Nature, Racing Today, blooper show Good As Gold and was a panellist on Grand Prix TV. In 2009 Laura was a newsreader for Fox Sports News. Csortan hosted a behind the scenes show for Australia's Got Talent in 2012.

Since 2012, Csortan has been a regular on Channel 7's The Morning Show where she hosts travel segments. Csortan has regularly appeared on Sunrise as a panellist.

Other
Csortan has appeared in advertising for Qantas. She lent her support for Ralph Lauren's Pink Pony campaign, the RSPCA's Set a Sister Free campaign, SunSCHine (Sydney Children's Hospital) Variety Club, and the Pink Hope Bright Pink Lipstick Day charity campaigns.

Csortan has performed internationally as a master of ceremonies for a number of events including Gday USA for Qantas, Fashions on the Field events for Myer and Emirates, Schwarzkopf Face of the Year, and the Good Food Expo, as well as for brands such as Toyota, Subaru, Mercedes Benz and Ducati.

Personal life

Csortan grew up riding dirt bikes on her family's farm and has been described as a "petrolhead with a penchant for motorbikes".

Csortan gave birth to a daughter, Layla Rose, in 2016.

Filmography

References

External links
 

1976 births
Australian beauty pageant winners
Australian female models
Models from Sydney
Australian television presenters
Living people
Miss Universe 1997 contestants
Miss World 1997 delegates
Australian women television presenters